is a Japanese football player. He plays for Matsue City FC.

Career
Gaku Sugamoto joined J3 League club Grulla Morioka in 2017.

Club statistics
Updated to 22 February 2020.

References

External links
Profile at Grulla Morioka

1994 births
Living people
Rikkyo University alumni
Association football people from Kanagawa Prefecture
Japanese footballers
J3 League players
Japan Football League players
Iwate Grulla Morioka players
Matsue City FC players
Association football midfielders